William Henry "Dusty" Hare  (born 29 November 1952) is a former international  rugby union footballer who played fullback.

Hare holds the world record for points scored in a first-class rugby career, with 7,337 points.

He was born in Newark-on-Trent, Nottinghamshire and attended the Magnus Grammar School (now Magnus Church of England School).

Rugby career
Hare played for Newark RUFC & Nottingham R.F.C. before joining Leicester Tigers and playing nearly 400 games for them.

He made his England debut 16 March 1974 in a match against Wales, and played his final game ten years later on, having gained 25 caps.  He toured with the British Lions to New Zealand in 1983.

He retired from club rugby after the 1989 cup final loss to Bath, and is now the chief scout at Northampton Saints.  Previous to this job, Hare was a farmer in South Clifton, Nottinghamshire and had been since a young man carrying on the family business.  However, Hare sold the farm in 2001 to take a full-time job at Leicester Tigers working for the academy and latterly as head scout.

In January 2010 it was announced that he was to join Northampton Saints. He returned to Tigers in 2017

Cricket career
Hare was also a good cricketer, and he played ten first-class and seven List A matches for Nottinghamshire between 1971 and 1977. He played regularly for the Nottinghamshire Second XI and Under-25s between 1969 and 1978.

See also
 List of top English points scorers and try scorers

References

External links
Photos, biography & statistics at Sporting-Heroes.net
Rugby Speakers
Cricinfo stats
BBC sport
Hare's cricket record at CricketArchive

1952 births
Living people
British & Irish Lions rugby union players from England
England international rugby union players
English cricketers
English rugby union players
Leicester Tigers players
Members of the Order of the British Empire
Nottingham R.F.C. players
Nottinghamshire cricketers
People educated at Magnus Church of England School
Rugby union fullbacks
Rugby union players from Newark-on-Trent